Daniel Charles Seigle (born June 14, 1976) is a Filipino-American basketball coach and former professional basketball player. He is the former head of basketball operations of the De La Salle Green Archers men's basketball team and a team consultant for the San Miguel Alab Pilipinas of the ASEAN Basketball League. He last played for the TNT KaTropa of the Philippine Basketball Association. He won the 1999 PBA Rookie of the Year and led San Miguel to six championships (out of a total of eight) during his career. He is also a two-time member of the Philippine national basketball team.

Amateur career
Seigle starred for his high school basketball team, leading them to winning 59 consecutive games and a state title. He then joined the Wagner College Seahawks after being recruited by coach Tim Capstraw. Seigle became a two-time Northeast Conference first-team selection for the Seahawks. Closing his college career with scoring 20-plus points in nine of his final ten games, he finished sixth in Wagner's all-time scoring list, with 1,652 total points scored, and also in the top ten all-time for field goals, 3-pointers and free throws.

PBA career

San Miguel Beermen (1999–2011)

Early years
In 1999, San Miguel acquired Seigle as its direct hire Filipino-foreign cager, after the league instituted a rule for every team to have one Filipino-foreign cager acquired without going through the process of joining the rookie draft. Danny has an older brother named Andy, who was then still playing for the Mobiline Phone Pals by the time Danny himself was acquired by the Beermen. Their mother, Blesylda Yadao, is a Filipina while his father is American.

Despite a huge showing in the 1999 All-Filipino Conference, the Beermen were eliminated by eventual champion Formula Shell. However, the Beermen won the 1999 Commissioner's Cup and the Governor's Cup, with Seigle, 1998 Rookie of the Year Danny Ildefonso, Olsen Racela and imports Terquin Mott (Commissioner's Cup) and Lamont Strothers (Governor's Cup) leading the charge. At season's end, Seigle won the Rookie of the Year honors. In 2000, Seigle continued to spark big numbers for San Miguel and led the team in regaining the Commissioner's and Governor's Cup titles. He set the league record winning 4 Finals MVP awards.

Injuries
In his fourth season with the league, Seigle joined the RP National Training Pool, as preparation for the 2002 Asian Games in Busan, South Korea. Although he did sit a few games for guest RP teams Hapee and Selecta during the Governor's and Commissioner's Cup, Seigle managed to play in a number of exhibition games against foreign clubs. However, during a pre-Asian Games match against Qatar on September 22, 2002, Seigle suffered a torn right Achilles tendon after taking a shot.

Due to the extent of the injury, Seigle missed the entire 2003 season. While there were hints of a possible return during the season, the team kept him on the injured list. He made his much-awaited return to the team in the 2004 Fiesta Conference, albeit in a much limited role. It was the first time Seigle played for San Miguel since 2001. However, Seigle's old form resurfaced in the 2004-05 Philippine Cup, leading San Miguel to a third-place finish. In the 2005 Fiesta Conference, Danny helped the Beermen win their 17th title.

Return to Form
The Philippine Cup put Seigle in the headlines as he scored at least 20+ points in 19 straight times during the conference breaking Alvin Patrimonio's previous record. It also helped San Miguel gain an outright semifinals berth while earning him the Best Player of the Conference Award, his second since 1999.

Air21 Express/Barako Bull (2011–2013)
In the 2010–2011 season, after playing many successful years for San Miguel Beermen, Seigle was traded to the Air21 Express along with Paul Artadi, Dorian Peña and Dondon Hontiveros. Seigle has declined an offer from Barako Bull for a contract extension as he expressed his desire to explore other options, less than two weeks before the start of the PBA's 39th season.

Talk 'N Text Tropang Texters
During the 2013–14 Philippine Cup, Seigle was signed by the Talk 'N Text Tropang Texters. He made his debut on December 3, 2013 with a total of 13 points and 8 rebounds.
On January 19, 2014, he made a career high of 21 points as a Talk 'N Text player against Brgy. Ginebra San Miguel and closed their elimination with a lopsided win. He also became the 31st local player to reach 8,000 career points in the PBA.
He won his 8th and last championship with the Tropang Texters after they defeated the Rain or Shine Elasto Painters in seven games during the 2015 Commissioner's Cup.
He played for four seasons with the Katropa.

Coaching career

San Miguel Alab Pilipinas
After the 2017 season of the PBA, Seigle was hired as an assistant coach for the San Miguel Alab Pilipinas alongside head coach Jimmy Alapag.

De La Salle
In May 2019, he became the Head Coach of De La Salle Green Archers.

Personal life
Seigle lives in Makati and has business interests in Manila and in the US.

Awards

Professional Basketball Career

 1999 PBA Rookie of the Year
 1999 PBA Finals Most Valuable Player (Commissioner's Cup)
 1999 PBA Mythical First Team
 1999 PBA Best Player of the Conference
 1999 PBA Finals Most Valuable Player (Governor's Cup)
 2000 PBA Finals Most Valuable Player (Governor's Cup)
 2000 PBA Mythical First Team
 2000 PBA Most Points
 2000 PBA Most Freethrows Made
 2000 PBA Most 2-Pointers Made
 2001 PBA Finals Most Valuable Player (All-Filipino Cup)
 2001 PBA Mythical First Team
 2001 PBA Most Points
 2001 PBA Most Freethrows Made
 2005-2006 PBA Best Player of the Conference
 2005-2006 PBA Comeback Player of the Year
 2005-2006 PBA Mythical Second Team
 2005-2006 PBA Most Freethrows Made
 2006 Brunei Sultan Cup Most Valuable Player
 First Player to score 20+ in 19 straight games (League Record)
 Voted 9 times as PBA All Star
 PBA Top 10 Most Free Throws Made
 31st PBA Player to reach 8,000 points (January 19, 2014) 
 49th PBA Player to reach 300 blocks on 02/12/17 
 2-time Philippine National Team Member (2002,2007)
 4-time PBA Finals Most Valuable Player (League Record)
 3-time PBA Mythical First Team, 1-time PBA Mythical Second Team
 2-time PBA Best Player of the Conference
 14 PBA Finals Appearances
 18 PBA Seasons
 8-time PBA Champion
 Wagner College Athletics Hall of Fame, Member (Induction Class 2014)

High school
 USA Today High School Honorable Mention All-American
 Pennsylvania High School All-State Player twice
 Scranton Times-Tribune Regional Player of the Year as a High School Senior

College
 1994-1995 Northeast Conference All Newcomer Team
 1995-1996 Northeast Conference All Conference Second Team 
 1996-1997 Northeast Conference All Conference First Team
 1997-1998 Northeast Conference All Conference First Team
 Wagner College Athletics Hall of Fame, Member (Induction Class 2014)

National team career
Seigle was selected to be a member of the 2002 and 2007 Philippine National Team.

In 2006, in preparation for the Tokushima Games, he played for the National team leading them to their second straight Brunei Cup title. Seigle was also named as the tournament's Most Valuable Player.

Wagner Hall of Fame
On October 4, 2014, Seigle was inducted into the Wagner College Athletics Hall of Fame.

PBA career statistics

Correct as of August 3, 2016

Season-by-season averages 

|-
| style="text-align:left;"| 1999
| style="text-align:left;"| San Miguel
| 55 || 40.7 || .311 || .290 || .780 || 7.2 || 2.0 || .7 || .7 || 19.2
|-
| style="text-align:left;"| 2000
| style="text-align:left;"| San Miguel
| 51 || 39.3 || .322 || .288 || .734 || 6.0 || 2.8 || .6 || .5 || 20.1
|-
| style="text-align:left;"| 2001
| style="text-align:left;"| San Miguel
| 56 || 37.2 || .402 || .356 || .778 || 6.1 || 2.6 || .6 || .5 || 18.8
|-
| style="text-align:left;"| 2004–05
| style="text-align:left;"| San Miguel
| 59 || 31.1 || .434 || .315 || .781 || 5.6 || 2.2 || .6 || .5 || 17.3
|-
| style="text-align:left;"| 2005–06
| style="text-align:left;"| San Miguel
| 44 || 32.6 || .449 || .127 || .769 || 7.8 || 2.4 || .6 || .8 || 20.1
|-
| style="text-align:left;"| 2006–07
| style="text-align:left;"| San Miguel
| 28 || 30.4 || .456 || .333|| .797 || 8.0 || 2.0 || .6 || .5 || 22.2
|-
| style="text-align:left;"| 2007–08
| style="text-align:left;"| Magnolia
| 38 || 25.3 || .429 || .343 || .784 || 6.4 || 1.2 || .3 || .5 || 15.4
|-
| style="text-align:left;"| 2008–09
| style="text-align:left;"| San Miguel
| 15 || 23.4 || .426 || .286 || .851 || 5.3 || 1.7 || .2 || .8 || 13.4
|-
| style="text-align:left;"| 2009–10
| style="text-align:left;"| San Miguel
| 29 || 15.3 || .371 || .258 || .759 || 3.5 || .9 || .1 || .4 || 6.9
|-
| style="text-align:left;"| 2010–11
| style="text-align:left;"| San Miguel
| 40 || 24.0 || .428 || .268 || .756 || 5.7 || 1.3 || .4 || .9 || 12.1
|-
| style="text-align:left;"| 2011–12
| style="text-align:left;"| Barako Bull
| 31 || 22.5 || .461 || .314 || .722 || 4.9 || 1.3 || .9 || .6 || 12.8
|-
| style="text-align:left;"| 2012–13
| style="text-align:left;"| Barako Bull
| 31 || 21.2 || .437 || .300 || .724 || 4.6 || 1.3 || .3 || .4 || 11.8
|-
| style="text-align:left;"| 2013–14
| style="text-align:left;"| Talk 'N Text
| 28 || 15.5 || .436 || .308 || .760 || 4.3 || .8 || .4 || .4 || 8.3
|-
| style="text-align:left;"| 2014–15
| style="text-align:left;"| Talk 'N Text
| 28 || 10.3 || .441 || .250 || .717 || 2.5 || .6 || .1 || .2 || 5.0
|-
| align=left | 
| align=left | TNT
| 15 || 13.8 || .444 || .000 || .614 || 3.3 ||	1.0 ||	.5 ||	.7 ||	6.6
|-class=sortbottom
| style="text-align:center;" colspan=2 | Career
| 548 || 28.2 || .401 || .302 || .766 || 5.7 ||	1.8 ||	.5 ||	.5 ||	15.3

References

External links
 The Official Site of the Philippine Basketball Association

1976 births
Living people
American sportspeople of Filipino descent
ASEAN Basketball League coaches
Barako Bull Energy players
Basketball players from Pennsylvania
Filipino men's basketball coaches
Filipino men's basketball players
Philippine Basketball Association All-Stars
Philippines men's national basketball team players
Power forwards (basketball)
San Miguel Beermen players
Small forwards
Sportspeople from Scranton, Pennsylvania
TNT Tropang Giga players
Wagner Seahawks men's basketball players
American men's basketball players
Citizens of the Philippines through descent
American sportspeople of Chinese descent
De La Salle Green Archers basketball coaches